The Church of Santa María de Llas is a Roman Catholic church in the Las Arenas parish of the municipality of Cabrales, in the autonomous community of Asturias, Spain. It is considered a historical monument.

The church retains a Romanesque main portal.

Maria de Llas
Romanesque architecture in Asturias
Bien de Interés Cultural landmarks in Asturias